Vagharshak Kosyan is an Armenian-Abkhazian military leader and politician. During the War in Abkhazia, he was commander of the Bagramyan Battalion. Kosyan was awarded the Hero of Abkhazia title, the highest state award of Abkhazia, for his services. He is a former Deputy Speaker of the People's Assembly of Abkhazia.

Biography
His family came from Ordu and took refugee in Abkhazia during the Armenian genocide. He was the first secretary of the Gagra Komsomol during the Soviet period. During the War in Abkhazia, Kosyan organized the creation of the Armenian motorized infantry Bagramyan Battalion within the Abkhazian separatist army. He was praised for combat effectiveness by Abkhazian President Vladislav Ardzinba. For his services, Kosyan was awarded the Hero of Abkhazia, Order of Leon, and Medal "For Courage" honors.

After the war he worked in economics. Kosyan was thrice elected deputy of the Gagra District Assembly and is a former Deputy Speaker of the People's Assembly of Abkhazia.

Honors
 Hero of Abkhazia
 Order of Leon
 Medal "For Courage"

References

External links
 Interview (in Russian)

Living people
5th convocation of the People's Assembly of Abkhazia
Abkhaz Armenians
Year of birth missing (living people)